Muellerina is a Cenozoic genus of  ostracods in the family Hemicytheridae. The name is a tribute to German zoologist specializing in ostracod biology Christian Gustav Wilhelm Müller (1857-1940).

See also 
 List of prehistoric ostracod genera

References

External links 
 

Podocopida genera
Prehistoric ostracod genera
Hemicytheridae